Sapwuahfik, formerly Ngatik, or the Raven Islands is a  atoll of the Federated States of Micronesia.

Geography 

The largest and only inhabited island is Ngatik, at the western end.

While Ngatik is the only inhabited island, the six larger of the remaining islands are used by the population for harvesting coconuts and growing taro, and animal husbandry (pigs and chickens). There are 12 buildings for temporary shelter on those islands.

The islands, clockwise, starting at Ngatik in the west:

Airfield 
Sapwuahfik has an airstrip that lies just off the island of Ngatik, the Sapwuahfik Civil Airfield. Coastal erosion has cut the airstrip off from the island by about 20 meters, making it necessary to ferry arriving and departing passengers between it and Ngatik by boat. There are on-call personnel who go to the airfield whenever a flight is expected.

Population 

The population of Sapwuahfik is approximately 433 (2010). The culture is closely related to that of Pohnpei, its closest neighbor; however it retains its own distinctive character.

The local creole, Ngatik Men's Creole, developed as a result of the 1837 Ngatik massacre, during which the island's male population was wiped out by the crew of Australian captain C.H. Hart and Pohnpeian warriors. Some of the Europeans and Pohnpeians settled and repopulated the island, taking the local women as wives. The island formed a new culture and language, a mixture of English and Ngatikese (a Pohnpeic language). In addition to the creole, which is only spoken by men, all of the residents speak Ngatikese, a Pohnpeic language closely related to the Pohnpeian language.

History

The atoll was first discovered by Westerners on 6 April 1773 by the Spanish naval officer Felipe Tompson when sailing from Manila to San Blas in New Spain on board of the vessel Nuestra Señora de la Consolación also called in short Buen Fin. Tompson charted the island as Los Valientes (the island of the bold in Spanish). At some point between 1793 and 1796, William Raven, captain of Britannia gave a firm sighting to the island.

Education
Pohnpei State Department of Education operates public schools:
 Sapwuafik Elementary School

Transportation

Just east of the Sapwuahfik is an Sapwuahfik Airfield with a paved  runway.

See also
 Madolenihmw
 Kitti (municipality)
 U, Pohnpei
 Nett
 Kapingamarangi
 Pingelap
 Sokehs
 Nukuoro
 Mokil
 Kolonia
 Oroluk
 Palikir

Notes

References

External links 

 
 Deutsches Koloniallexikon (German)
 Statoids.com, retrieved December 8, 2010
 POHNPEI (Islas Carolinas orientales). 3º parte. (Spanish)

Atolls of the Federated States of Micronesia
Municipalities of Pohnpei
Islands of Pohnpei